This list of pageants of the Church of Jesus Christ of Latter-day Saints delineates those annual outdoor theatrical performance produced by members of the Church of Jesus Christ of Latter-day Saints (LDS Church). It is reminiscent of early Christian Pageants which reenacted the world history in processional performance. Latter-day Saint pageants are held outdoors, they are free to the public, and typically last for a two-week period. In December 2018, the LDS Church announced that four pageants will phased out over the next several years.

Pageants in production 

Easter Pageant Jesus the Christ, Mesa, Arizona: Temporarily suspended in 2019 and 2020 due to the renovation of the Mesa Arizona Temple, resumes in 2022
Truth Will Prevail (Chorley, Lancashire, England): Will generally be held every four years, with the next one deferred until 2023

Discontinued productions 
Castle Valley Pageant (Castle Dale, Utah)
Clarkston Pageant (Clarkston, Utah)
Hill Cumorah Pageant, Palmyra, New York: ended in 2019
Mormon Miracle Pageant, Manti, Utah
And it Came to Pass: An informal, indoor pageant near the Oakland California Temple, ceased production in 2007.<ref>Rott, Dale (2005). Intersections Between Theatre and the Church in the United States: 1930-1990. The Journal of Religion and Theatre.</ref> 

One-time productions
 
 People of the Book (Burbank, California, 1967)

See also

 Christian drama
 Easter Drama
 Jesuit drama
 Liturgical drama
 Morality play
 Mystery play
 Mormon literature
 Passion play
 Savior of the World

References

External links 
 Pageants Latter-day Saints official site
 LDS Church Official site

 Pageants